Phulwari Sharif Railway Station (Station Code: PWS), is a railway station serving the locality of Phulwari Sharif in the Patna district in the Indian state of Bihar.
The Phulwari Sharif railway station, is well connected to most of the major cities in India by the railway network, which lies in between Howrah–Delhi main line which serves it with numerous trains. Phulwari Sharif is well connected to Patna, Delhi, Mumbai, Kolkata, Varanasi, Kanpur, Guwahati and other cities.

Facilities
The major facilities available are Waiting rooms, retiring room, computerized reservation facility, Reservation Counter, Vehicle parking etc.
The vehicles are allowed to enter the station premises. There are refreshment rooms vegetarian and non vegetarian, tea stall, book stall, post and telegraphic office and Government Railway police(G.R.P) office.  Automatic ticket vending machines have been installed to reduce the queue for train tickets on the station.

Platforms
There are three platforms at Phulwari Sharif railway station. The platforms are interconnected with three pedestrian footbridges.

References

Railway stations in Patna
Danapur railway division